Belinda Jack is Fellow and Tutor in French literature and Language at Christ Church, Oxford at the University of Oxford, Professor of Rhetoric at Gresham College and the author of books such as The Woman Reader and George Sand: A Woman's Life Writ Large.

Education and career
After a period living in Paris and studying at the Sorbonne, Belinda Jack obtained a bachelor's degree in French with African and Caribbean Studies from the University of Kent. She then obtained her Doctor of Philosophy (D.Phil) in Négritude and Literary Criticism at St John's College, Oxford at the University of Oxford in 1989.

After completing her doctorate, Jack stayed on at the University of Oxford where she worked as a lecturer at a number of different Colleges before being awarded a Fellowship at Christ Church, Oxford. She continues to tutor at Christ Church, in French Literature and Language. Jack is an 'Official Student' at Christ Church, Oxford making her a Fellow and a Member of the Governing Body at the college. Jack currently teaches an Advanced Translation course at the Faculty of Medieval and Modern Languages, University of Oxford., and she is currently Director of the University of Oxford Undergraduate studies for Modern Languages.

In 2013, Belinda Jack was appointed as the 47th Professor of Rhetoric at Gresham College, following Richard J. Evans. In this role she delivers a series of free public lectures within the City of London. Her first series was on The Mysteries of Reading, and this was followed by The Mysteries of Writing Novels and Poems.

Other research work and publications
Belinda Jack has authored and co-authored a number of books and research publications. Her five books include:
 The Woman Reader (Yale, 2012)
 Beatrice's Spell: The Enduring Legend of Beatrice Cenci (Chatto and Windus, 2003)
 George Sand: A Woman's Life Writ Large (Chatto and Windus, 1999)
 Negritude and Literary Criticism: The History and Theory of 'Negro-African' Literature in French (Greenwood Press, 1996)
 Francophone Literatures: An Introductory Survey (Oxford: OUP, 1996).

When asked about writing her next book, Jack has said, "What I would like to write as my next book, will be a book about the novel and I want to try and do two things at once. I want, on the other hand, to introduce a novel in all its variety and at the same time, to give hints to would-be writers about how to read novels in order to write novels"

Jack co-authored Epreuve avant la lettre: George Sand et l'autobiographie renversee (Literature, 134 (2004), 121–130) which is written in the French language.

As well as authoring books and academic publications, Jack is widely published through her many articles, essays, chapters and reviews. These have appeared in The Wall Street Journal, Literary Review, The Times Literary Supplement, Times Higher Education and BBC History. She has regularly appeared on BBC Radio and television, as well as speaking frequently at literary festivals across the UK.

Reviews of The Woman Reader have been generally positive.

American author and renowned feminist Naomi Wolf wrote, "Engaging, lively and vigorous. The Woman Reader is a landmark work that no feminist-or for that matter, general reader-should miss" 
The Sunday Telegraph wrote "A rarefied study of women's reading over the centuries – a subject that is vast, but also intensely private, and that has left little trace for most of history"
Lesley McDowell for The Independent wrote "Jack's excellent history begins from a position of anxiety, which she argues is caused by women's access to the written word. What do women read and that happens to them, and the world, when they do?"

References

External links
Belinda Jack, Christ Church Oxford
Past Gresham College lectures by Professor Jack

Professors of Gresham College
Living people
English rhetoricians
Alumni of St John's College, Oxford
Alumni of the University of Kent
University of Paris alumni
Fellows of Christ Church, Oxford
Academics of the University of Oxford
English literary critics
Women literary critics
Literary critics of French
Historians of French literature
English feminists
English feminist writers
Year of birth missing (living people)